Beneficial insects (sometimes called beneficial bugs) are any of a number of species of insects that perform valued services like pollination and pest control. The concept of beneficial is subjective and only arises in light of desired outcomes from a human perspective. In agriculture, where the goal is to raise selected crops, insects that hinder the production process are classified as pests, while insects that assist production are considered beneficial. In horticulture and gardening, beneficial insects are often considered those that contribute to pest control and native habitat integration.

Encouraging beneficial insects, by providing suitable living conditions, is a pest control strategy, often used in organic farming, organic gardening or integrated pest management. Companies specializing in biological pest control sell many types of beneficial insects, particularly for use in enclosed areas, like greenhouses.

Types

Some species of bee are beneficial as pollinators, although generally only efficient at pollinating plants from the same area of origin, facilitating propagation and fruit production for many plants. Also, some bees are predators or parasites of pests. This group includes not only honeybees, but also many other kinds of bees that are more efficient at pollinating plants native to their region. Bees can be attracted by many companion plants, especially bee balm and pineapple sage for honeybees, or Apiaceae like Queen Anne's lace and parsley, for predatory bees. 
Wasps, especially fig wasps are also beneficial as pollinators.

Ladybugs are generally thought of as beneficial because they eat large quantities of aphids, mites and other arthropods that feed on various plants. 

Other insects commonly identified as beneficial include:
 Aphid Midges
 Assassin bugs
 Damsel bugs
 Earwigs
 Green lacewings
 Ichneumon wasps
 Minute pirate bugs
 Fireflies
 Praying Mantis
 Soldier beetles
 Syrphid flies
 Tachinid flies
 Trichogramma wasps

Arachnids
Although not technically insects, several types of arachnids are often included in lists of beneficial insects, including:
 Jumping spiders
 Wolf spiders
 Orb-weaver spiders
 Sheet-weaver spiders
 Harvestmen
 Predatory mites

Attractive plants

Plants in the families Apiaceae and Asteraceae are generally valuable companions. Here are other plants that attract beneficial insects:

Alfalfa
Alyssum
Borage
Calendula
Cilantro
Cosmos
Dandelion
Dill
Echinacea
Fennel
Hyssop
Lupin
Marigold
Milkweed
Nasturtium
Parsley
Phacelia
Queen Anne's lace
Rose
Rudbeckia
Sunflower
Wildflowers
Yarrow
Zinnia

See also

 Beneficial organism
 Beneficial weeds
 International Organization for Biological Control
 List of companion plants a common companion plant's function is the attraction of beneficial insects.
 List of beneficial weeds
 Organic gardening
 Satoyama
 Sustainable gardening
 Wildlife garden

References

Additional sources

External links
 Association of Natural Biocontrol Producers trade association of the biological control industry
 Beneficial Insects for Hydroponics

Insects in culture